Luis Robredo Villafuerte Sr. (August 29, 1935 – September 8, 2021) was a Filipino politician who served as Governor of Camarines Sur and as a member of the House of Representatives from 2004 to 2013. He represented Camarines Sur's 2nd district from 2004 to 2010, and the 3rd district from 2010 to 2013.

Death
Villafuerte died on September 8, 2021, at the St. Luke's Medical Center – Global City, ten days after his 86th birthday.

References

External links
 House of Representatives Official website
 Villafuerte, Luis Personal Information

|-

|-

|-

|-

1935 births
2021 deaths
Governors of Camarines Sur
Filipino Roman Catholics
Bicolano people
Nationalist People's Coalition politicians
Bicolano politicians
Members of the House of Representatives of the Philippines from Camarines Sur
Secretaries of Trade and Industry of the Philippines
People from Camarines Sur
Ferdinand Marcos administration cabinet members
Members of the Batasang Pambansa
University of the Philippines alumni